Yekaterina Pavlovna Peshkova, née Volzhina (26 July 1887 – 26 March 1965) was a Soviet human rights activist and humanitarian, first wife of Maxim Gorky.

Life 
Before the October Revolution she took an active part in the work of the Committee for Assistance to Russian Political Prisoners (Комитет помощи русским политкаторжанам) under the leadership of Vera Figner. After 1914 she led the Children's Commission at the Society for Assistance to War Victims. After 1918 she was the major activist of the Moscow Committee of the Political Red Cross.

After 1922, she was chairwoman of the subsequent organisation the Assistance to Political Prisoners (Pompolit, Помощь политическим заключенным, Помполит). She was honoured by an order of the Polish Red Cross for her participation in the exchange of prisoners of war  after the Polish-Soviet War.

In 1927, she was instrumental in securing the commutation and release of Yosef Yitzchak Schneersohn after he was accused of counter-revolutionary activities, and sentenced to death.

References

External links
 Yaroslav Leontiev [https://web.archive.org/web/20070311171937/http://www.rg-rb.de/2005/24/mir.shtml Dear Ekaterina Pavlovna] 
 History of Political Red Cross
 The Murder of Maxim Gorky. A Secret Execution'' by Arkady Vaksberg. (Enigma Books: New York, 2007. .)

1887 births
1965 deaths
People from Sumy
People from Sumsky Uyezd
Russian nobility
Socialist Revolutionary Party politicians
Russian humanitarians
Women humanitarians
Soviet dissidents
Maxim Gorky